"Being Boring" is a song by English synth-pop duo Pet Shop Boys, released as the second single from their fourth studio album, Behaviour (1990). The song reached number 20 on the UK Singles Chart, marking the duo's first single to miss the top 10 since "Opportunities (Let's Make Lots of Money)" in 1986. Its music video was directed by fashion photographer Bruce Weber.

Background, lyrics and music
The song is concerned with the idea of growing up and how people's perceptions and values change as they grow older. The title apparently materialised after someone in Japan accused the duo of being boring. The title is also derived from a Zelda Fitzgerald quotation, "she refused to be bored chiefly because she wasn't boring".In an interview in 1993, Neil Tennant described "Being Boring" as "one of the best songs that we've written", and said that "For me it is a personal song because it's about a friend of mine who died of AIDS, and so it's about our lives when we were teenagers and how we moved to London, and I suppose me becoming successful and him becoming ill."

The track was originally demoed in a studio in West Glasgow, where the music for "My October Symphony", "The End of the World" and the unreleased "Love and War" were also written. The lyrics for the first two verses – the first one about the parties (referencing the Fitzgerald quote on an invitation card) and the second about Tennant's life in Newcastle in the 70s – had materialised by that point, while the third verse was to be written closer to recording the song. The final verse would be about "travelling the world in the 80s as the Pet Shop Boys" and wishing his (Tennant's) friend – who died of AIDS – was still there.

Later, the demo was presented to producer Harold Faltermeyer at Red Deer Studios, Munich, whose expertise in analog synthesizers would come to the forefront in the song's production. The basis of the song was laid with Roland TR-808 and Roland TR-909 drum machines, plus a Roland TB-303 bass synthesizer. Synthesizers used included a Roland Jupiter-8 (which makes up the layered textures in the introduction and the melody line throughout), an Oberheim OB-8 (which was blended with the Jupiter-8 for the main melody) and a Synclavier (for the harp glissandos).

Further work was done at Sarm West Studios in London with Julian Mendelsohn; the "wakka-wakka" guitar line by J.J. Belle (influenced by Isaac Hayes's Theme from Shaft (1971)) was recorded there, among a few other parts.

Live
In spite of the track's moderate commercial success, "Being Boring" has been played regularly at concerts. It was not initially performed on the tour of 1991, Performance; leading to many fans, including Axl Rose of Guns N' Roses, complaining about its omission. As a result, it was added as an encore late in the tour with the band commenting that it "invariably got the best reception of the night." It has since become a mainstay of their live performances.

Critical reception
Stephen Thomas Erlewine from AllMusic called the song "wistful". A reviewer from Music & Media commented, "Up-tempo, smooth and pushy pop from the Boys. The nervous groove is made out of a persistent rhythm guitar and a floating synth. A natural hit, produced by Pet Shop Boys and Harold Faltermeyer." Selina Webb from Music Week wrote, "Hardly boring, but certainly one of their most gently-handled tracks. The Scandal-style productions puts the emphasis on the charming lyrics which deliver the Tennant muse in oblique phrases, not unlike those found in a New Order song. As usual its appeal is enhanced with each airing and, equally, it will enjoy a sustained chart performance." Roger Morton from NME described "Being Boring" as "a scrapbook flick through his journey from expectant Northern youth in the '70s to a doubting '90s adulthood, burdened by unease and a sense of loss (of close friends)." In their single review, an reviewer from the magazine wrote, "The only heart-thumping moment on "Being Boring" is when some synthetic harp sound appears from nowhere to add a bit of colour to the otherwise grey monotony of the song."

Music video
The accompanying music video for "Being Boring", the first by fashion photographer Bruce Weber, totally in black and white, shows a house party and begins with a nude swimmer and a message: "I came from Newcastle in the North of England. We used to have lots of parties where everyone got dressed up and on one party invitation was the quote 'she was never bored because she was never boring'. The song is about growing up, the ideals that you have when you're young and how they turn out". Due to some brief shots of full male nudity throughout the clip, the video was banned from MTV and relegated to airing on the Playboy Channel.

B-side
The B-side, "We All Feel Better in the Dark" was written around a piece of music Chris Lowe had composed and features him as the lead vocalist. He said that "The idea came from a tape I bought from a health food shop round the corner from the studio: The Secrets of Sexual Attraction. The words are terrible. Awful. Embarrassing." The track proved to be a fan favourite and was performed live during their Performance Tour in 1991. The remix 12-inch includes two mixes of the track by Brothers in Rhythm.

Track listings
 7-inch, cassette, and mini-CD single
 "Being Boring" – 4:50
 "We All Feel Better in the Dark" – 4:00

 12-inch single
A. "Being Boring" (extended mix) – 10:40
B. "We All Feel Better in the Dark" (extended mix) – 6:45

 12-inch remix single
A1. "Being Boring" (Marshall Jefferson remix) – 9:01
B1. "We All Feel Better in the Dark" (After Hours Climax) – 5:29
B2. "We All Feel Better in the Dark" (Ambient) – 5:20

 CD single
 "Being Boring" – 4:50
 "We All Feel Better in the Dark" – 4:00
 "Being Boring" (extended mix) – 10:40

Charts

References

External links
 10 Years of Being Boring Fan website dedicated entirely to every aspect of the song
 BBC – Sold on Song Highlight on "Being Boring"

1990 singles
1990 songs
Black-and-white music videos
LGBT-related songs
Parlophone singles
Pet Shop Boys songs
Song recordings produced by Harold Faltermeyer
Songs about HIV/AIDS
Songs written by Chris Lowe
Songs written by Neil Tennant